Léa may refer to:

People with the given name Léa
Princess Léa of Belgium (born Léa Inga Dora Wolman; 1951), the widow of Prince Alexandre of Belgium and aunt of King Philippe of Belgium
Léa Bouard (born 1996), German freestyle skier
Léa Catania (born 1993), French synchronized swimmer 
Léa Clermont-Dion (born 1991) is a Canadian author, feminist, television and radio host, and body image advocate
Léa Cousineau, Canadian politician and a City Councillor in Montreal
Léa Curinier (born 2001), French racing cyclist 
Léa Drucker (born 1972), French actress
Léa Fazer (born 1965), Swiss film director, screenwriter and actress
Léa Fehner (born 1981), French film director and screenwriter
Léa Garcia (born 1933), Brazilian actress
Léa Jamelot (born 1992), French canoeist
Léa Labrousse (born 1997), French individual and synchronised trampolinist
Léa Le Garrec (born 1993), French footballer
Léa Lemare (born 1996), French ski jumper
Léa Linster (born 1955), Luxembourg chef
Léa Palermo (born 1993), French badminton player
Léa Parment (born 1996), French ice hockey player 
Léa and Christine Papin, two French sisters and live-in maids, convicted of murdering their employer's wife and daughter in Le Mans, France on February 2, 1933.
Léa Pool (born 1950), Swiss-Canadian filmmaker 
Léa Roback (1903–2000), Canadian trade union organizer, social activist, pacifist, and feminist
Léa Roussel (born 1992), French acrobatic gymnast
Léa Salamé (born 1979), Lebanese-born French journalist
Léa Serna (born 1999), French figure skater
Léa Seydoux (born 1985), French actress
Léa Sprunger (born 1990), Swiss track and field athlete
Léa Stein (born 1936), French artist and accessories make

People with the middle name Léa
James Léa Siliki (born 1996), French footballer

People with the surname Léa
Charles Léa (born 1951), Cameroonian footballer
Eugène N'Jo Léa (1931–2006), Cameroonian footballer

Other uses
Léa (film), 2011 French erotic drama film directed by Bruno Rolland

See also
 
LEA (disambiguation), also covers Lea
Lea (given name)
Lea (surname) 
LEAS (disambiguation)